The abbreviation MTE or M.T.E. may refer to:

 Multicultural Toronto English, a sociolect dialect spoken by youth culture living in Southern Ontario, particularly the Greater Toronto Area.
 The Metabolic Theory of Ecology, which argues that ecological phenomena result from metabolic constraints
 The Brazilian Ministry of Labor and Employment
 MCA Television Entertainment, a former division of Universal Television
Materiel de Traction Electrique joint subsidiary of Creusot-Loire and Jeumont-Schneider
MAC-then-Encrypt (MtE), one of approaches to Authenticated encryption
Mathematical Table Errata, an increasingly numbered periodical column about errors in mathematical tables in the journal Mathematics of Computation